Xysticus croceus is a crab spider in the genus Xysticus found in Nepal, Bhutan, China, Korea, Taiwan, and in Japan, where it is called "yami-iro kani-gumo". It is about 7 mm long

It looks in grass and fallen leaves for prey to eat. It hides under stones in the winter, and is often seen in spring and early summer.

Footnotes

References
  (2007): The world spider catalog, version 8.0. American Museum of Natural History.

Thomisidae
Spiders of Asia
Spiders described in 1937